Orthodox is the debut studio album by American rock band Beware of Darkness, released May 7, 2013 by Bright Antenna Records. The album was made available as a digital download, CD and double vinyl.

Track listing
All songs written by Kyle Nicolades, except "All Who Remain" written by Kyle Nicolades/John 5

Charts

Personnel

Beware of Darkness
Kyle Nicolaides – lead vocals, lead guitar 
Daniel Curcio – bass 
Tony Cupito – drums, percussion 
Additional
Executive Producer: D. Sardy 
Produced by Greg Gordon & Kyle Nicolaides 
Engineered by Greg Gordon, & Claudio Cueni 
Mixed by D. Sardy 
“Sweet Girl”, “Life On Earth” & “Hummingbird” mixed by Claudio Cueni 
“Ghost Town” mixed by Mark Needham
Mastered by Stephen Marcussen 
Photography by Miguel Starcevich
Design by Kii Arens
A&R by Braden Merrick
Additional Musicians: Drums on “Sweet Girl by Joey Benenati Cello on “Ghost Town” by Stevie Blacke Vocals on “Ghost Town” by Elsie Kunkel 
Intro of “End of the World” engineered by Sep V. & Paul Glueckert

References

External links 
 

2013 debut albums
Beware of Darkness (band) albums